is a Japanese shōjo and josei manga artist.

She made her debut as a professional manga artist in 1968 with Yuki no Serenade. In 1986 she received the Kodansha Manga Award for shōjo for Yūkan Club, and in 2007, she received an Excellence Prize in manga at the Japan Media Arts Festival for Pride. Several of her series have been dramatized, including Yūkan Club as an anime OVA and Designer and Tadashii Ren'ai no Susume as high-rated live-action television dramas. A live-action film based on her work Pride was released in 2009.

Yoshimi Uchida worked for her as an assistant in the 1970s.

References

External links 
 
 Profile at The Ultimate Manga Guide

1949 births
Living people
Japanese female comics artists
Manga artists from Okayama Prefecture
Winner of Kodansha Manga Award (Shōjo)
Women manga artists